Euleptorhamphus viridis is a species of fish in the family Hemiramphidae.

References 

Hemiramphidae
Fish described in 1823